A kalos inscription (καλός) is a form of epigraph found on Attic vases and graffiti in antiquity, mainly during the Classical period from 550 to 450 BC. The word kalos (καλός) means "beautiful", and in the inscriptions it had an erotic connotation.

Overview
The kalos inscription is typically found on vessels used for a symposium. The scenes that accompany the inscription vary, and include athletic exercises and myths.

Some inscriptions are generic, reading only "the boy is beautiful" (ὁ παῖς καλός). The inscription more often took the form of the beloved's name, in the nominative singular, followed by "kalos" (X kalos, i.e. "X is beautiful"). The beloved is most often a male youth, but a few times girls or women were spoken of as kalē (καλή). In one early cataloging of the inscriptions, among the individuals labeled as beautiful were 30 women and girls, and 528 youths. Male names outnumber female by more than twenty to one. At least some of the women labeled kalē were hetairai, courtesans or prostitutes.

The names designated as kalos are characteristic of aristocratic citizens. Some kalos inscriptions are associated with certain vase painters or pottery workshops. The Antimenes Painter, for instance, is named for the kalos inscription to Antimenes on his pots, and the Leagros Group pottery workshop is named for the youth Leagros, a widely popular object of kalos praise. These associations suggest a cult of celebrity or a concerted effort by a given youth's family to increase their son's public standing.

The purpose of these inscriptions remains uncertain, and many examples may be declarations of love as part of same-sex courtship in Athens. In some cases, the inscriptions or vessels may have been made to order.

Kalos names are also found as graffiti on walls, the most abundant example being the find on Thassos of 60 kalos inscriptions carved on rock dating from the 4th century. The non-epigraphic literary evidence consists of two references in Aristophanes. Both of these instances, however, praise the demos (the citizenry as a whole) rather than any individual, and suggest the public performance role of the kalos tag.

Examples

References

Sources
Neil W. Slater. "The Vase as Ventriloquist: Kalos-inscriptions and the Culture of Fame", in Signs of Orality: The Oral Tradition and its Influence in the Greek and Roman World (ed. E. Anne Mackay). Leiden: Brill, 1999, pp. 143–161.
Kenneth J. Dover. Greek Homosexuality. 2nd edition. London: Duckworth, 1989.
François Lissarrague. Publicity and performance. Kalos inscriptions in Attic vase-painting, In: Performance Culture and Athenian Democracy, Cambridge 1999, pp. 359–373.
H. Alan Shapiro. Leagros the Satyr in Greek Vases: Images, Contexts and Controversies., ed. Clemente Marconi, 2004, pp. 1–12.

External links 

6th-century BC inscriptions
5th-century BC inscriptions
Ancient Greek pottery
Greek inscriptions